Matías Ezequiel Zaldivia (born January 22, 1991) is an Argentine naturalized Chilean football defender currently playing for Chilean Primera División team Universidad de Chile.

Club career
Zaldivia made his professional debut for Chacarita Juniors in 2010.

Personal life
In December 2021, he acquired the Chilean nationality by residence along with his colleague Diego Buonanotte, keeping the Argentine nationality.

Honours
Arsenal de Sarandí
Copa Argentina: 2012-13
Supercopa Argentina: 2012

Colo-Colo
Primera División: 2017 Transición
Copa Chile: 2016
Supercopa de Chile (2): 2017, 2018

References

External links

 Profile at Ceroacero
 Profile at Worldfootball

1991 births
Living people
People from San Isidro, Buenos Aires
Argentine footballers
Naturalized citizens of Chile
Chilean footballers
Argentine expatriate footballers
Chacarita Juniors footballers
Arsenal de Sarandí footballers
Colo-Colo footballers
Universidad de Chile footballers
Primera Nacional players
Argentine Primera División players
Chilean Primera División players
Expatriate footballers in Chile
Argentine expatriate sportspeople in Chile
Argentine emigrants to Chile
Association football defenders
Sportspeople from Buenos Aires Province